Lestradea is a genus of East African cichlids from the Lake Tanganyikan endemic tribe Ectodini.

Characteristics
The species in Lestradea have a spindle-shaped, elongated body which is 3.5-4 times longer than it is high. Their dorsal fin has 13-16 spines and 13-16 rays, while the anal fin has 3 spines and 9-11 rays. The outermost ray in the ventral fins is elongated. They have two lateral lines. They have silvery coloured bodies, with sexually mature males having black throat and ventral fins. The specific name honours Arthur Lestrade (1897-1990), who collected the type of the type species of this genus as part of an important series of fishes he collected from Lake Tanganyika for the Royal Museum of Central Africa.

Species
There are two species in the genus:

 Lestradea perspicax Poll, 1943
 Lestradea stappersii (Poll, 1943)

References 

 
Ectodini
Taxa named by Max Poll
Cichlid genera
Taxonomy articles created by Polbot